Aleshino is a rural locality (a village) in Kubenskoye Rural Settlement, Vologodsky District, Vologda Oblast, Russia. The population was 39 as of 2002.

Geography 
Aleshino is located 31 km northwest of Vologda (the district's administrative centre) by road. Pogost Voskresenye is the nearest rural locality.

References 

Rural localities in Vologodsky District